Chia is a cryptocurrency where mining (or farming, in Chia parlance) is based on the amount of hard disk storage space devoted to it rather than processing power as with Proof of work cryptocurrencies such as Bitcoin. The platform was created by a California based company called Chia Network Inc. The Chia Network was founded in 2017 by American computer programmer Bram Cohen, the author of the BitTorrent protocol. In May 2021, Chia Network raised a $61 million investment, valuing the company at about $500 million. The same month, the company announced plans to conduct an IPO before the end of 2021, however as of March 2022, the IPO has not yet occurred.

Computer data storage shortages 
In China, stockpiling ahead of the May 2021 launch led to shortages and an increase in the price of hard disk drives (HDD) and solid-state drives (SSD). Shortages were also reported in Vietnam. Hard drive manufacturer Seagate said in May 2021 that the company was experiencing strong orders and that staff were working to "adjust to market demand". In May 2021 Gene Hoffman, then president and current CEO of Chia Network, admitted that "we’ve kind of destroyed the short-term supply chain" for hard disks. During the first months since Chia's launch, concerns were raised about the prerequisite plotting process drastically limiting a hard drives' lifetime. However, these concerns were demonstrated to be unfounded.

References 

Cryptocurrency projects
2017 establishments